Shajn is a surname. Notable people with the surname include:

Grigory Shajn (1892–1956), Soviet/Russian astronomer, husband of Pelageya
Pelageya Shajn (1894–1956), Russian astronomer

Russian-language surnames